Russula alachuana is a species of mushroom.

See also
List of Russula species

alachuana